"Going Under" is a 2003 song by Evanescence.

Going Under may also refer to:

Film and Television
 Going Under (1991 film), a comedy film starring Bill Pullman and Dean Cain
 Going Under (2004 film), a drama film starring Geno Lechner and Roger Rees
 Going Under working title of Once Upon a Time in Venice, 2016 comedy film starring Bruce Willis, Jason Momoa, and John Goodman
 "Going Under" (Prison Break), a season four episode of Prison Break
 "Going Under" (CSI: Miami), an episode of CSI: Miami

Music
 "Going Under", a song by Patti Smith from her 1988 album Dream of Life
 "Going Under", a song by Devo from their 1981 album New Traditionalists
 "Going Under", a song by Rockers Hi-Fi
 "Going Under", is the B-side song to Marillion's "Incommunicado" from the Clutching at Straws album
 "Going Under (Didn't Have To)", 2014 song by Australian country music trio The McClymonts from their Here's To You & I album
 "Going Under" is a 2007 single off the Even Heroes Need a Parachute album by Christian rock bank This Beautiful Republic
 "Going Under", single off the 2006 Human Nature album by Canadian hard rock band Harem Scarem

Video games 

 Name This Game, a 1982 video game for Atari 2600, honorarily renamed Going Under by a contest in 1994
 Going Under (video game), a 2020 roguelike video game developed by Aggro Crab

Other
Going Under, a 1996 novel by Virgil Suárez